Stress was an American pop rock band formed in San Diego in 1983.

Biography
Stress was founded in 1983 by bassist Josquin des Pres and vocalist/guitarist Mike Thomas. They added guitarist Tim Nicholson and went through a number of drummers; most notably Jeff Gabaldon and Leroy Vega (formerly of Assassin). When Nicholson left in early 1985, he was replaced with guitarist Jimmy Crespo, who had previously played with Aerosmith.

Stress performed primarily in San Diego and Los Angeles performing at clubs such as Madame Wong's, FM Station, The Troubadour, and The Roxy.

Stress Disbanded in late 1987 when Josquin Des Pres began a career as a record producer and Mike Thomas started a solo career. His first solo effort "Circular Motion" recorded in France in 1988 was produced by Josquin Des Pres.

Former members
 Mike Thomas - vocals, guitar
 Tim Nicholson - guitar
 Josquin Des Pres - bass guitar
 Jeff Gabaldon - drums
 Leroy Vega - drums
 Jimmy Crespo - guitar

Discography

Studio albums
Killing Me Night & Day (1984) Burnett Records
Killing Me Night & Day (reissue with bonus tracks) (2001) Deep Shag Records

Singles
Killing Me Night & Day/It's Too Bad (1984) Burnett Records
Search For The Fool/You're So Critical (1985) N.E.W. Records

External links
Stress page at Deep Shag Records
Straita Head Sound - webpage honoring the 80's rock scene in San Diego

Rock music groups from California
Musical groups from San Diego
American pop rock music groups